Poletti is an Italian and Swiss surname.  Holders include (alphabetically):

Alberto José Poletti (born 1946), Argentine retired footballer
Bérengère Poletti (born 1959), French politician
Charles Poletti (1903–2002), American politician
Fabrizio Poletti (born 1943), Italian footballer
Felix Poletti (born 1965), Swiss skeleton racer
Giuliano Poletti (born 1951), Italian politician
Ignacio Poletti (born 1930), Argentine former basketball player
Kurt Poletti (born 1960), Swiss bobsledder
Lee Poletti (born 1948), former Australia lawn bowls international
Lina Poletti (1885–1971), Italian feminist
Luigi Poletti (mathematician) (1864–1967), Italian poet and mathematician
Luigi Poletti (architect) (1792–1869), Italian architect
Roberto Poletti (born 1971), Italian journalist and politician
Syria Poletti (1917–1991), Italo-Argentine writer
Ugo Poletti (1914–1997), Italian cardinal

Surnames
Italian-language surnames